Romain Leleu (born 7 November 1983) is a French classical trumpeter. He is the elder brother of tuba player Thomas Leleu.

Life 
Born in lille, Leleu waselectedrévélation soliste instrumental by the Victoires de la Musique Classique in 2009.

Trained by Éric Aubier, he entered the Conservatoire de Paris at age 15, and received in 2003 a First Prize for trumpet with "very good" mention, followed by the Chamber Music prize, unanimously.

He then improved his skills with Reinhold Friedrich at the  Hochschule für Musik Karlsruhe.

Leleu is a regular guest at French and international festivals: Festival de La Roque-d'Anthéron, Festival de Radio France et Montpellier, Folle Journée de Nantes, etc.

Many contemporary creators call on him, as do Martín Matalon (premiere of Trame XII for trumpet and orchestra), Philippe Hersant (Création de Folk Tunes for solo trumpet), Karol Beffa (premiere of the Concerto for trumpet and orchestra, Subway for trumpet and piano and Buenos Aires for brass quintet)…

In chamber music, Romain Leleu performs regularly with Thierry Escaich, Olivier Vernet, Ghislain Leroy, Laurent Lefèvre, Igor Tchetuev, the Convergences ensemble, the Kheops Ensemble…

Leleu regularly leads master classes in France as well as abroad (Académie Internationale de Courchevel, Seoul National University, Tokyo College of Music,   - Mexico, University of Cincinnati – College-Conservatory of Music - USA, Tbilissi Conservatory of music - Georgia…).

Leleu is a laureate of the Del Duca foundation of the Académie des Beaux Arts. He is also a Chevalier de l'ordre des Arts et des Lettres, January 2016 class.

Leleu has been teaching trumpet at the Conservatoire National Supérieur de Musique de Lyon since 2018.

Discography 
 Trumpet concertos (Aparté/Harmonia Mundi) (2015), works by Jolivet, Delerue, Beffa, Robin, Matalon, with the Orchestre d'Auvergne
 Sur la route (Aparté/Harmonia Mundi), works by Bartók, Piazzolla, Tchaikovsky, Bellini, Michel Legrand, Nino Rota... with the Convergences Ensemble (April 2013 (AP052)
 Trumpet concertos (Aparté/Harmonia Mundi), Concertos by Haydn, Hummel, Neruda. Baltic Chamber Orchestra - Emmanuel Leducq-Barôme.
Cadences by Stockhausen and Penderecki.  
 Famous trumpet sonatas: Romain Leleu/Julien Le Pape, works by Brandt, Enescu, Raymond Gallois-Montbrun, Beffa, Escaich... (Indésens/codaex)
 Slavonic Spirit: Romain Leleu/Julien Le Pape, works by Bohme, Glazunov, Rachmaninov, Arutunian, Rimsky-Korsakov... (2010) (Aparté/Harmonia Mundi)
 Les Vents français (Compilation Sony)

References

External links 
 Romain Lelue (France Musique)
 Discography (Discogs)
 Romain Leleu (Ensemble Calliopée)
 Romain Leleu (Conservatoire de Lyon)
 Bach- Concerto BWV 972 after Vivaldi- Romain Leleu trumpet- Ghislain Leroy organ (YouTube)

1983 births
Living people
Musicians from Lille
Conservatoire de Paris alumni
French classical trumpeters
Male trumpeters
21st-century French musicians
French music educators
Chevaliers of the Ordre des Arts et des Lettres
21st-century trumpeters
21st-century French male musicians
French Republican Guard Band musicians